The Kasabe language is an extinct language of Cameroon, formerly spoken around Mambila in the Nyalang area. The last speaker, a man named Bogon died on 5 November 1995.

Bibliography
 Connell, B. (1995). Dying Languages and the Complexity of the Mambiloid Group. Paper presented at the 25th Colloquium on African Languages and Linguistics, Leiden.

References

Extinct languages of Africa
Languages of Cameroon
Mambiloid languages